Charmaine Thomas (born 25 August 1974) is an Antigua and Barbuda sprinter. She competed in the women's 4 × 100 metres relay at the 1996 Summer Olympics.

References

1974 births
Living people
Athletes (track and field) at the 1995 Pan American Games
Athletes (track and field) at the 1996 Summer Olympics
Antigua and Barbuda female sprinters
Olympic athletes of Antigua and Barbuda
Place of birth missing (living people)
Pan American Games competitors for Antigua and Barbuda
Olympic female sprinters